Marc Robert Wilmots (born 22 February 1969) is a Belgian professional football manager and former player who most recently managed Raja CA. During his club career as an attacking midfielder, he won trophies with KV Mechelen, Standard Liège and Schalke 04. He also represented the Belgium national team.

Wilmots has also been a politician, having sat in the Senate for four years for the Mouvement Réformateur party.

Club career
In his club career, which started in 1987, Wilmots played for Sint-Truiden, Mechelen, Standard Liège, Schalke 04, and Bordeaux. At Schalke, he helped them to the 1997 UEFA Cup final. His goal in the first leg was cancelled out by Internazionale in the second leg, but Schalke went on to win the game on penalties, with Wilmots scoring the decisive goal. He retired in 2003, after his second stint with Schalke. During his time with Schalke, the fans there gave him the affectionate nickname "Das Kampfschwein" (The War Pig), which has been picked up by some English language journalists. In Belgium he is known under the nickname the Bull of Dongelberg, an allusion to his birthplace.

International career
For Belgium, Wilmots scored 28 goals in 70 caps, his first coming in May 1990. He went to four World Cups, playing in three. After being an unused substitute in 1990, he played 54 minutes in 1994 without scoring, but scored two goals in 1998 and three in 2002, making him Belgium's leading goal scorer in World Cup history. He also scored a goal against Brazil in the last 16 match of the 2002 World Cup which was disallowed because of a "phantom foul" on Roque Júnior. According to Wilmots, the referee Peter Prendergast apologized for the error to him at half time. Wilmots was named as one of the seven reserves in the 2002 World Cup All-Star Team.

Wilmots also played in Euro 2000, when Belgium co-hosted the tournament.

Managerial career
Wilmots became a football manager in summer 2004 for Sint-Truiden, but was sacked in February 2005. Between 2009 and 2012, he served as assistant manager of the Belgium national team under Dick Advocaat and later Georges Leekens. On 15 May 2012, following the exit of Leekens, Wilmots assumed the Belgium reins on an interim basis before going onto become permanent coach, signing a contract until June 2014.

On 11 October 2013, Belgium qualified for the 2014 FIFA World Cup. Wilmots is credited with "not only giving the young group confidence in themselves as well as enjoying a close relationship with his players but also at the same time being capable of instilling discipline to the squad." During the group stage, Belgium topped the group with all three wins, before exiting the tournament at the quarter-final stage.

On 13 October 2015, Belgium won the group to qualify for the UEFA Euro 2016 in the last game of the stage against Israel. After a disappointing European Championship, Wilmots was fired by the Royal Belgian Football Association on 15 July 2016.

In March 2017 Wilmots was appointed as the manager of Ivory Coast national team. However he was sacked from his position six months later after failing to qualify for the World Cup.

On 15 May 2019, Wilmots agreed a three years contract to become the manager of the Iranian national team, after Portuguese coach Carlos Queiroz left the team after eight years in charge following Iran's semifinal exit in the Asian Cup. He officially signed his contract on 29 May, effective from 1 June 2019. On 4 December 2019, following shock defeats to both Iraq and Bahrain he left his role as Iran coach after six games in charge.

On 11 November 2021, Moroccan team Raja CA announced that Wilmots would be their new head coach until 2024, succeeding Lassaad Chabbi.  Wilmonts was sacked three months later by Raja on 21 February 2022.

Political career
After retiring as a footballer, Wilmots went into politics. He was elected to the Senate for the French-speaking conservative party, the Reformist Movement (Mouvement Réformateur or MR) in the 2003 federal election. He received 79,437 votes, a number surpassed only by 17 other candidates in the whole country during the elections.

In 2005, he announced that he wanted to resign as a senator, a rather unconventional and criticized constitutional move.

Career statistics

Club

International

Scores and results list Belgium's goal tally first, score column indicates score after each Wilmots goal.

Managerial statistics

Honours

Player
KV Mechelen

 Belgian First Division: 1988–89
 European Super Cup: 1988
 Amsterdam Tournament: 1989
 Jules Pappaert Cup: 1990

Standard Liège

 Belgian Cup: 1992–93
 Intertoto Cup: runner-up 1996

Schalke 04
 UEFA Cup: 1996–97
 DFB-Pokal: 2001–02

Belgium
 FIFA Fair Play Trophy: 2002 World Cup

Individual
 Young Professional Footballer of the Year: 1989–90
 Kicker German Football Rankings - International Class Player: 1997-98, 2001-02
 Best Belgian Footballer Abroad: 2001, 2002
 Belgian Sports Merit Award: 2002
Golden Shoe Lifetime Achievement Award: 2002
4 FIFA World Cup participations: 1990, 1994, 1998, 2002
 Belgian Sports Coach of the Year: 2013, 2014
 Raymond Goethals Award: 2015
 Globe Soccer Awards Best Coach of the Year: 2015

References

Bibliography
 

1969 births
Living people
People from Jodoigne
Belgian footballers
Belgian people of German descent
Sint-Truidense V.V. players
K.V. Mechelen players
Standard Liège players
FC Schalke 04 players
FC Girondins de Bordeaux players
Expatriate footballers in France
Belgian football managers
FC Schalke 04 managers
Expatriate football managers in Germany
Bundesliga managers
Sint-Truidense V.V. managers
Belgium international footballers
1990 FIFA World Cup players
1994 FIFA World Cup players
1998 FIFA World Cup players
2002 FIFA World Cup players
UEFA Euro 2000 players
Belgian Pro League players
Bundesliga players
Expatriate footballers in Germany
Ligue 1 players
Belgian expatriate footballers
Members of the Senate (Belgium)
Reformist Movement politicians
21st-century Belgian politicians
Belgium national football team managers
2014 FIFA World Cup managers
Footballers from Walloon Brabant
UEFA Euro 2016 managers
Association football midfielders
Ivory Coast national football team managers
Iran national football team managers
UEFA Cup winning players
Belgian sportsperson-politicians
Raja CA managers
Botola managers